Deuker is a surname. Notable people with the surname include: 

Carl Deuker (born 1950), author of young adult novels
Ernst Ulrich Deuker (born 1954), German bass player and contrabass clarinet player

See also
Decker (surname)
Denker